Pseudaclytia is a genus of moths in the subfamily Arctiinae. The genus was erected by Arthur Gardiner Butler in 1876.

Species
 Pseudaclytia bambusana Schaus, 1938
 Pseudaclytia major Druce, 1906
 Pseudaclytia minor Schaus, 1905
 Pseudaclytia opponens Walker, 1864
 Pseudaclytia popayanum Dognin, 1902
 Pseudaclytia pseudodelphire Rothschild, 1912
 Pseudaclytia umbrica Druce, 1898
 Pseudaclytia unimacula Schaus, 1905

References

Arctiinae